Robb is a surname. Robb or Robbs may also refer to:


Places
 Robb, Alberta, Canada, a hamlet
 Robb Glacier, Ross Dependency, Antarctica
 Robb Township, Posey County, Indiana, United States

People
 Robb (given name), a list of people
 Robb Banks, stage name of American hip hop artist Richard Burrel (born 1994)

Other uses
 Robb Engineering, a Canadian former manufacturing company
 Robbs, a former department store in Hexham, England
 The Robbs, an American 1960s pop and rock band

See also
Rob (disambiguation)